John Wayne "Big John" Mangum Sr. (September 30, 1942 — April 29, 1994) was an American football defensive tackle in the American Football League.

College career
Mangum started his collegiate career at Ole Miss before transferring to Southern Mississippi. He was considered the anchor of the Golden Eagles' defensive line when the team led the nation in total defense in his junior and senior seasons. Mangum played in the Blue–Gray Football Classic and the Senior Bowl after his senior season.

Professional career
Mangum was selected in the fifth round of the 1966 American Football League Draft by the Boston Patriots. He played two seasons for the Patriots, playing in 28 games.

Personal life
Mangum is the father of former Alabama and Chicago Bears defensive back John Mangum and former Carolina Panthers tight end Kris Mangum. His grandson, Jake Mangum, played college baseball at Mississippi State and is the Southeastern Conference's career hit leader  and is now a member of the Miami Marlins organization.

References

1942 births
1994 deaths
American football defensive tackles
Boston Patriots players
Southern Miss Golden Eagles football players
Ole Miss Rebels football players
People from Magee, Mississippi
Players of American football from Mississippi